Ward J. Edwards (born February 28, 1930) was an American politician. He was a member of the Georgia House of Representatives from 1967 to 1993. He is a member of the Democratic party.

References

Living people
Democratic Party members of the Georgia House of Representatives
1930 births